The 2012 United States Senate election in New York took place on November 6, 2012, concurrently with the U.S. presidential election as well as other elections to the United States Senate and House of Representatives as well as various state and local elections.

Governor David Paterson appointed then-U.S. Representative Kirsten Gillibrand to serve as U.S. Senator from New York until the 2010 special election, succeeding former U.S. Senator Hillary Clinton, who resigned to serve as U.S. Secretary of State in the Obama administration. Gillibrand won the special election in 2010 with 62.95% of the vote over former U.S. Representative Joseph DioGuardi.

Incumbent Democratic U.S. Senator Kirsten Gillibrand won re-election to her first full term. She was opposed in the general election by Wendy Long (who ran on the Republican and Conservative Party tickets) and by three minor party candidates. Gillibrand was re-elected with 72% of the vote. She carried 60 out of 62 counties statewide.

Democratic primary

Candidates 
 Kirsten Gillibrand, incumbent U.S. Senator

Gillibrand was endorsed by the Independence Party of New York and the Working Families Party and appeared on the ballot lines of both of those parties in the general election.

Republican primary

Candidates

Declared 
 Wendy E. Long, attorney
 George Maragos, Nassau County Comptroller
 Bob Turner, U.S. Representative, New York's 9th congressional district

The 2012 New York State Republican Convention took place on March 16, 2012. Candidates Wendy Long, George Maragos, and Congressman Bob Turner each reached the threshold of 25% of the weighted vote necessary to qualify for the June 26 primary ballot; however, none of the candidates achieved a majority. Long prevailed by a sizeable margin in the June 26 Republican primary, receiving 50.9% of the vote; Turner received 35.6% and Maragos 13.5%.

Long was designated as the nominee for the Conservative Party of New York State, and appeared on its ballot line in the general election as well as the Republican Party line.

Withdrew 
 Joe Carvin, Rye Town Supervisor, withdrew on March 16, 2012 to run for the House of Representatives against Nita Lowey.

Polling

Endorsements 

Source: Update for US Senate Election NY 2012:   http://www.elections.ny.gov/NYSBOE/elections/2012/General/USSenator_07292013.pdf

Results

General election

Candidates 
 Colia Clark (Green), civil rights activist and candidate for the U.S. Senate in 2010
 Chris Edes (Libertarian)
 Kirsten Gillibrand (Democratic, Working Families, Independence), incumbent U.S. Senator
 Wendy Long (Republican, Conservative), attorney
 John Mangelli (Common Sense Party)

Debates 
Complete video of debate, October 17, 2012 - C-SPAN

Fundraising

Top contributors

Top industries

Predictions

Polling 

with George Maragos

with Bob Turner

with Marc Cenedella

with Harry Wilson

Results

By congressional district
Gillibrand won all 27 congressional districts, including six held by Republicans.

See also 
 2012 United States Senate elections
 2012 United States House of Representatives elections in New York
 2012 New York state elections

References

External links 
 New York State Board of Elections
 Campaign contributions at OpenSecrets.org
 Outside spending at Sunlight Foundation
 Candidate issue positions at On the Issues

Official campaign websites
 Colia Clark for U.S. Senate
 Kirsten Gillibrand for U.S. Senate
 Wendy Long for U.S. Senate
 Scott Noren for U.S. Senate

New York
2012
2012 New York (state) elections
Kirsten Gillibrand